The 2018–19 New York Knicks season was the 73rd season of the franchise in the National Basketball Association (NBA). On April 12, 2018, the Knicks fired head coach Jeff Hornacek after the team missed the playoffs. On May 7, 2018, the Knicks hired David Fizdale as head coach. The Knicks were eliminated from playoff contention on March 4, 2019, when they lost to the Sacramento Kings 115–108. The team ended the season with the worst record in the NBA, and tied the franchise-worst record set in the 2014–15 season.

Draft

Roster

Standings

Division

Conference

Game log

Preseason
The preseason schedule was announced on July 9, 2018.

|- style="background:#bfb;"
| 1
| October 1
| @ Washington
|  
| Dotson (14)
| Knox (10)
| Mudiay (5)
| Capital One Arena11,826
| 1–0
|- style="background:#bfb;"
| 2
| October 3
| @ Brooklyn
| 
| Trier (25)
| Kanter (20)
| Burke (3)
| Barclays Center12,424
| 2–0
|- style="background:#bfb;"
| 3
| October 5
| New Orleans
| 
| Hardaway Jr. (21)
| Kanter (15)
| Mudiay (6)
| Madison Square Garden17,162
| 3–0
|- style="background:#fbb;"
| 4
| October 8
| Washington
| 
| Hardaway Jr., Trier (18)
| Vonleh (7)
| Mudiay, Trier (4)
| Madison Square Garden17,695
| 3–1
|- style="background:#fbb;"
| 5
| October 12
| Brooklyn
| 
| Hardaway Jr. (18)
| Vonleh (5)
| Ntilikina (5)
| Madison Square Garden19,812
| 3–2

Regular season
The regular season schedule was released on August 10, 2018.

|- style="background:#bfb;"
| 1
| October 17
| Atlanta
| 
| Hardaway Jr. (31)
| Kanter (11)
| Hardaway Jr. (5)
| Madison Square Garden18,249
| 1–0
|- style="background:#fbb;"
| 2
| October 19
| @ Brooklyn
| 
| Hardaway Jr., Kanter (29)
| Kanter (10)
| Burke, Ntilikina (4)
| Barclays Center17,732
| 1–1
|- style="background:#fbb;"
| 3
| October 20
| Boston
| 
| Hardaway Jr. (24)
| Kanter (15)
| Burke (9)
| Madison Square Garden19,427
| 1–2
|- style="background:#fbb;"
| 4
| October 22
| @ Milwaukee
| 
| Hardaway Jr. (24)
| Kanter (13)
| Ntilikina (5)
| Fiserv Forum16,228
| 1–3
|- style="background:#fbb;"
| 5
| October 24
| @ Miami
| 
| Dotson (20)
| Dotson (10)
| Ntilikina (5)
| American Airlines Arena19,600
| 1–4
|- style="background:#fbb;"
| 6
| October 26
| Golden State
| 
| Hardaway Jr. (24)
| Kanter (13)
| Hardaway Jr., Vonleh (4)
| Madison Square Garden19,812
| 1–5
|- style="background:#bfb;"
| 7
| October 29
| Brooklyn
| 
| Hardaway Jr. (25)
| Kanter (15)
| Hardaway Jr. (8)
| Madison Square Garden19,221
| 2–5
|- style="background:#fbb;"
| 8
| October 31
| Indiana
| 
| Hardaway Jr. (37)
| Vonleh (10)
| Ntilikina (7)
| Madison Square Garden18,295
| 2–6

|- style="background:#bfb;"
| 9
| November 2
| @ Dallas
| 
| Trier (23)
| Robinson (10)
| Ntilikina (7)
| American Airlines Center20,008
| 3–6
|- style="background:#fbb;"
| 10
| November 4
| @ Washington
| 
| Kanter (18)
| Kanter (12)
| Hardaway Jr. (4)
| Capital One Arena16,679
| 3–7
|- style="background:#fbb;"
| 11
| November 5
| Chicago
| 
| Kanter (23)
| Kanter (24)
| Kanter (7)
| Madison Square Garden19,812
| 3–8
|- style="background:#bfb;"
| 12
| November 7
| @ Atlanta
| 
| Hardaway Jr. (34)
| Vonleh (13)
| Hardaway Jr., Mudiay, Ntilikina (3)
| State Farm Arena12,412
| 4–8
|- style="background:#fbb;"
| 13
| November 10
| @ Toronto
| 
| Hardaway Jr. (27)
| Kanter (15)
| Ntilikina (4)
| Scotiabank Arena19,800
| 4–9
|- style="background:#fbb;"
| 14
| November 11
| Orlando
| 
| Knox (17)
| Kanter (15)
| Burke (5)
| Madison Square Garden19,812
| 4–10
|- style="background:#fbb;"
| 15
| November 14
| @ Oklahoma City
| 
| Hardaway Jr. (20)
| Hezonja (6)
| Mudiay (5)
| Chesapeake Energy Arena18,203
| 4–11
|- style="background:#fbb;"
| 16
| November 16
| @ New Orleans
| 
| Hardaway Jr. (30)
| Hardaway Jr. (8)
| Trier (5)
| Smoothie King Center14,717
| 4–12
|- style="background:#fbb;"
| 17
| November 18
| @ Orlando
| 
| Hardaway Jr. (32)
| Kanter (19)
| Kanter (3)
| Amway Center15,898
| 4–13
|- style="background:#fbb;"
| 18
| November 20
| Portland
| 
| Hardaway Jr. (32)
| Vonleh (14)
| Kanter (6)
| Madison Square Garden19,812
| 4–14
|- style="background:#bfb;"
| 19
| November 21
| @ Boston
| 
| Burke (29)
| Kanter, Vonleh (10)
| Burke (11)
| TD Garden18,624
| 5–14
|- style="background:#bfb;"
| 20
| November 23
| New Orleans
| 
| Mudiay (27)
| Kanter, Vonleh (11)
| Vonleh (5)
| Madison Square Garden18,948
| 6–14
|- style="background:#bfb;"
| 21
| November 25
| @ Memphis
| 
| Hardaway Jr. (22)
| Kanter (26)
| Mudiay (4)
| FedExForum14,331
| 7–14
|- style="background:#fbb;"
| 22
| November 27
| @ Detroit
| 
| Trier (24)
| Kanter (14)
| Trier (7)
| Little Caesars Arena13,935
| 7–15
|- style="background:#fbb;"
| 23
| November 28
| @ Philadelphia
| 
| Hezonja, Kanter (17)
| Knox, Vonleh (7)
| Hardaway Jr. (3)
| Wells Fargo Center20,274
| 7–16

|- style="background:#bfb;"
| 24
| December 1
| Milwaukee
| 
| Mudiay (28)
| Kanter (7)
| Hardaway Jr. (8)
| Madison Square Garden19,812
| 8–16
|- style="background:#fbb;"
| 25
| December 3
| Washington
| 
| Hardaway Jr. (20)
| Kanter (16)
| Knox, Mudiay (4)
| Madison Square Garden19,440
| 8–17
|- style="background:#fbb;"
| 26
| December 6
| @ Boston
| 
| Hardaway Jr. (22)
| Kanter (11)
| Mudiay (6)
| TD Garden18,624
| 8–18
|- style="background:#fbb;"
| 27
| December 8
| Brooklyn
| 
| Kanter (23)
| Kanter (14)
| Mudiay, Vonleh (4)
| Madison Square Garden18,662
| 8–19
|- style="background:#fbb;"
| 28
| December 9
| Charlotte
| 
| Knox (26)
| Knox (15)
| Vonleh (9)
| Madison Square Garden18,602
| 8–20
|- style="background:#fbb;"
| 29
| December 12
| @ Cleveland
| 
| Hardaway Jr., Kanter (20)
| Kanter (10)
| Mudiay (7)
| Quicken Loans Arena19,432
| 8–21
|- style="background:#bfb;"
| 30
| December 14
| @ Charlotte
| 
| Mudiay (34)
| Vonleh (11)
| Mudiay (8)
| Spectrum Center17,622
| 9–21
|- style="background:#fbb;"
| 31
| December 16
| @ Indiana
| 
| Kanter (20)
| Kanter (15)
| Mudiay (6)
| Bankers Life Fieldhouse16,646
| 9–22
|- style="background:#fbb;"
| 32
| December 17
| Phoenix
| 
| Mudiay (32)
| Kanter (10)
| Mudiay (6)
| Madison Square Garden18,437
| 9–23
|- style="background:#fbb;"
| 33
| December 19
| @ Philadelphia
| 
| Hardaway Jr. (27)
| Vonleh (10)
| Hardaway Jr., Mudiay, Vonleh (5)
| Wells Fargo Center20,424
| 9–24
|- style="background:#fbb;"
| 34
| December 21
| Atlanta
| 
| Mudiay (32)
| Vonleh (10)
| Hardaway Jr. (5)
| Madison Square Garden19,080
| 9–25
|- style="background:#fbb;"
| 35
| December 25
| Milwaukee
| 
| Knox (21)
| Vonleh (14)
| Mudiay (5)
| Madison Square Garden19,812
| 9–26
|- style="background:#fbb;"
| 36
| December 27
| @ Milwaukee
| 
| Kornet (23)
| Vonleh (13)
| Mudiay (6)
| Fiserv Forum18,058
| 9–27
|- style="background:#fbb;"
| 37
| December 29
| @ Utah
| 
| Hardaway Jr. (18)
| Vonleh (9)
| Kornet, Mudiay (5)
| Vivint Smart Home Arena18,306
| 9–28

|- style="background:#fbb;"
| 38
| January 1
| @ Denver
| 
| Kornet (19)
| Vonleh (14)
| Mudiay (9)
| Pepsi Center19,520
| 9–29
|- style="background:#bfb;"
| 39
| January 4
| @ L.A. Lakers
| 
| Hardaway Jr. (22)
| Kanter (15)
| Mudiay (6)
| Staples Center18,997
| 10–29
|- style="background:#fbb;"
| 40
| January 7
| @ Portland
| 
| Kanter (18)
| Kanter, Vonleh (14)
| Mudiay (7)
| Moda Center19,026
| 10–30
|- style="background:#fbb;"
| 41
| January 8
| @ Golden State
| 
| Hezonja (19)
| Kanter (16)
| Mudiay (4)
| Oracle Arena19,596
| 10–31
|- style="background:#fbb;"
| 42
| January 11
| Indiana
| 
| Mudiay (21)
| Thomas (7)
| Dotson (4)
| Madison Square Garden19,812
| 10–32
|- style="background:#fbb;"
| 43
| January 13
| Philadelphia
| 
| Knox (31)
| Knox (7)
| Ntilikina (6)
| Madison Square Garden18,596
| 10–33
|- style="background:#fbb;"
| 44
| January 17
| @ Washington
| 
| Mudiay (25)
| Vonleh (10)
| Trier (3)
| The O2 Arena19,078
| 10–34
|- style="background:#fbb;"
| 45
| January 21
| Oklahoma City
| 
| Hardaway Jr. (23)
| Robinson, Trier (6)
| Trier (8)
| Madison Square Garden19,493
| 10–35
|- style="background:#fbb;"
| 46
| January 23
| Houston
| 
| Trier (31)
| Vonleh, Trier (10)
| Ntilikina (6)
| Madison Square Garden18,819
| 10–36
|- style="background:#fbb;"
| 47
| January 25
| @ Brooklyn
| 
| Burke (25)
| Vonleh (13)
| Burke, Ntilikina (5)
| Barclays Center17,033
| 10–37
|- style="background:#fbb;"
| 48
| January 27
| Miami
| 
| Hardaway Jr. (22)
| Vonleh (9)
| Hardaway Jr. (5)
| Madison Square Garden18,852
| 10–38
|- style="background:#fbb;"
| 49
| January 28
| @ Charlotte
| 
| Knox (19)
| Vonleh (12)
| Hardaway Jr. (4)
| Spectrum Center13,963
| 10–39
|- style="background:#fbb;"
| 50
| January 30
| Dallas
| 
| Knox (17)
| Robinson (7)
| Allen, Burke, Hardaway Jr. (3)
| Madison Square Garden18,842
| 10–40

|- style="background:#fbb;"
| 51
| February 1
| Boston
| 
| Dotson (22)
| Vonleh (11)
| Vonleh (7)
| Madison Square Garden18,343
| 10–41
|- style="background:#fbb;"
| 52
| February 3
| Memphis
| 
| Knox (17)
| Jordan (12)
| Smith Jr. (6)
| Madison Square Garden17,025
| 10–42
|- style="background:#fbb;"
| 53
| February 5
| Detroit
| 
| Smith Jr. (25)
| Robinson (10)
| Smith Jr. (6)
| Madison Square Garden17,853
| 10–43
|- style="background:#fbb;"
| 54
| February 8
| @ Detroit
| 
| Smith Jr. (31)
| Jordan (11)
| Smith Jr. (8)
| Little Caesars Arena14,430
| 10–44
|- style="background:#fbb;"
| 55
| February 9
| Toronto
| 
| Knox (20)
| Jordan (18)
| Allen, Smith Jr. (6)
| Madison Square Garden18,886
| 10–45
|- style="background:#fbb;"
| 56
| February 11
| @ Cleveland
| 
| Allen (25)
| Jordan (10)
| Allen (6)
| Quicken Loans Arena19,432
| 10–46
|- style="background:#fbb;"
| 57
| February 13
| Philadelphia
| 
| Trier (19)
| Robinson (13)
| Jordan (7)
| Madison Square Garden18,983
| 10–47
|- style="background:#bfb;"
| 58
| February 14
| @ Atlanta
| 
| Smith Jr. (19)
| Jordan (13)
| Allen (9)
| State Farm Arena14,179
| 11–47
|- style="background:#fbb;"
| 59
| February 22
| Minnesota
| 
| Dotson, Trier (20)
| Jordan (19)
| Smith Jr. (7)
| Madison Square Garden19,096
| 11–48
|- style="background:#bfb;"
| 60
| February 24
| San Antonio
| 
| Dotson (27)
| Robinson (14)
| Smith Jr. (13)
| Madison Square Garden18,019
| 12–48
|- style="background:#bfb;"
| 61
| February 26
| Orlando
| 
| Mudiay (19)
| Robinson (14)
| Ellenson (5)
| Madison Square Garden17,833
| 13–48
|- style="background:#fbb;"
| 62
| February 28
| Cleveland
| 
| Trier (22)
| Vonleh (10)
| Smith Jr. (8)
| Madison Square Garden17,573
| 13–49

|- style="background:#fbb;"
| 63
| March 3
| @ L.A. Clippers
| 
| Dotson, Vonleh (17)
| Robinson (13)
| Smith Jr. (6)
| Staples Center19,068
| 13–50
|- style="background:#fbb;"
| 64
| March 4
| @ Sacramento
| 
| Trier (29)
| Vonleh (13)
| Mudiay, Smith Jr. (5)
| Golden 1 Center17,034
| 13–51
|- style="background:#fbb;"
| 65
| March 6
| @ Phoenix
| 
| Jordan (17)
| Jordan (14)
| Smith Jr. (6)
| Talking Stick Resort Arena14,427
| 13–52
|- style="background:#fbb;"
| 66
| March 9
| Sacramento
| 
| Smith Jr. (18)
| Jordan (15)
| Smith Jr. (5)
| Madison Square Garden19,812
| 13–53
|- style="background:#fbb;"
| 67
| March 10
| @ Minnesota
| 
| Dotson (26)
| Robinson (10)
| Dotson (6)
| Target Center13,806
| 13–54
|- style="background:#fbb;"
| 68
| March 12
| @ Indiana
| 
| Mudiay (21)
| Jordan (16)
| Jordan (5)
| Bankers Life Fieldhouse16,679
| 13–55
|- style="background:#fbb;"
| 69
| March 15
| @ San Antonio
| 
| Dotson (21)
| Jordan (13)
| Jordan (9)
| AT&T Center18,354
| 13–56
|- style="background:#bfb;"
| 70
| March 17
| L.A. Lakers
| 
| Mudiay (28)
| Jordan (17)
| Mudiay (8)
| Madison Square Garden19,812
| 14–56
|- style="background:#fbb;"
| 71
| March 18
| @ Toronto
| 
| Trier (22)
| Jordan, Knox (6)
| Hezonja, Jordan, Mudiay, Trier (3)
| Scotiabank Arena19,800
| 14–57
|- style="background:#fbb;"
| 72
| March 20
| Utah
| 
| Knox (27)
| Robinson (12)
| Ellenson, Jordan, Mudiay (5)
| Madison Square Garden18,530
| 14–58
|- style="background:#fbb;"
| 73
| March 22
| Denver
| 
| Mudiay (21)
| Jordan (11)
| Ntilikina (5)
| Madison Square Garden19,290
| 14–59
|- style="background:#fbb;"
| 74
| March 24
| L.A. Clippers
| 
| Mudiay (26)
| Jordan (13)
| Mudiay (7)
| Madison Square Garden18,263
| 14–60
|- style="background:#fbb;"
| 75
| March 28
| Toronto
| 
| Robinson (19)
| Robinson (21)
| Jordan (4)
| Madison Square Garden19,812
| 14–61
|- style="background:#fbb;"
| 76
| March 30
| Miami
| 
| Mudiay (24)
| Robinson (14)
| Allen (6)
| Madison Square Garden19,812
| 14–62

|- style="background:#bfb;"
| 77
| April 1
| Chicago
| 
| Kornet (24)
| Robinson (10)
| Dotson (6)
| Madison Square Garden18,874
| 15–62
|- style="background:#fbb;"
| 78
| April 3
| @ Orlando
| 
| Hezonja (29)
| Hezonja, Robinson (9)
| Mudiay (10)
| Amway Center18,846
| 15–63
|- style="background:#fbb;"
| 79
| April 5
| @ Houston
| 
| Ellenson, Hezonja (16)
| Hezonja (16)
| Hezonja (11)
| Toyota Center18,055
| 15–64
|- style="background:#bfb;"
| 80
| April 7
| Washington
| 
| Hezonja (30)
| Robinson (11)
| Dotson, Hezonja, Knox, Smith Jr. (5)
| Madison Square Garden19,812
| 16–64
|- style="background:#bfb;"
| 81
| April 9
| @ Chicago
| 
| Smith Jr. (25)
| Robinson (17)
| Smith Jr. (5)
| United Center21,350
| 17–64
|- style="background:#fbb;"
| 82
| April 10
| Detroit
| 
| Jenkins (16)
| Knox (7)
| Allen (8)
| Madison Square Garden19,812
| 17–65

Player statistics

Regular season statistics
As of April 10, 2019

|-
| style="text-align:left;"| || 19 || 1 || 21.9 || .461 || .472 || .778 || 2.7 || 4.0 || .8 || .2 || 9.9
|-
| style="text-align:left;"| || 11 || 0 || 9.7 || .250 || .111 || .833 || .6 || 1.2 || .5 || .0 || 1.3 
|-
| style="text-align:left;"| || 33 || 7 || 20.9 || .413 || .349 || .827 || 1.9 || 2.8 || .6 || .2 || 11.8
|-
| style="text-align:left;"| || 73 || 40 || 27.5 || .415 || .368 || .745 || 3.6 || 1.8 || .8 || .1 || 10.7
|-
| style="text-align:left;"| || 17 || 0 || 13.8 || .412 || .441 || .739 || 3.4 || .9 || .4 || .1 || 6.0
|-
| style="text-align:left;"| || 4 || 0 || 15.8 || .407 || .000 || 1.000 || .8 || 1.8 || .3 || .3 || 6.5
|-
| style="text-align:left;"| || 46 || 46 || 32.6 || .388 || .347 || .854 || 3.5 || 2.7 || .9 || .1 || 19.1
|-
| style="text-align:left;"| || 58 || 24 || 20.8 || .412 || .276 || .763 || 4.1 || 1.5 || 1.0 || .1 || 8.8
|-
| style="text-align:left;"| || 3 || 0 || 10.7 || .500 ||  || .800 || 2.3 || .7 || .3 || 1.0 || 4.0
|-
| style="text-align:left;"| || 22 || 0 || 14.5 || .388 || .357 || .833 || 1.6 || 1.0 || .0 || .1 || 5.2
|-
| style="text-align:left;"| || 19 || 19 || 25.9 || .634 ||  || .773 || 11.4 || 3.0 || .5 || 1.1 || 10.9
|-
| style="text-align:left;"| || 44 || 23 || 25.6 || .536 || .318 || .814 || 10.5 || 1.9 || .4 || .4 || 14.0
|-
| style="text-align:left;"| || 75 || 57 || 28.8 || .370 || .343 || .717 || 4.5 || 1.1 || .6 || .3 || 12.8
|-
| style="text-align:left;"| || 46 || 18 || 17.0 || .378 || .363 || .826 || 2.9 || 1.2 || .6 || .9 || 7.0
|-
| style="text-align:left;"| || 12 || 2 || 13.3 || .447 || .313 || .643 || 2.3 || 1.3 || .7 || .2 || 4.7
|-
| style="text-align:left;"| || 2 || 1 || 27.0 || .211 || .200 || .800 || 1.5 || 2.5 || .5 || .5 || 7.0
|-
| style="text-align:left;"| || 59 || 42 || 27.2 || .446 || .329 || .774 || 3.3 || 3.9 || .7 || .3 || 14.8
|-
| style="text-align:left;"| || 43 || 16 || 21.0 || .337 || .287 || .767 || 2.0 || 2.8 || .7 || .3 || 5.7
|-
| style="text-align:left;"| || 66 || 19 || 20.6 || .694 ||  || .600 || 6.4 || .6 || .8 || 2.4 || 7.3
|-
| style="text-align:left;"| || 21 || 18 || 28.6 || .413 || .289 || .568 || 2.8 || 5.4 || 1.3 || .4 || 14.7
|-
| style="text-align:left;"| || 46 || 17 || 17.0 || .396 || .278 || .750 || 2.5 || .6 || .4 || .2 || 4.5
|-
| style="text-align:left;"| || 64 || 3 || 22.8 || .448 || .394 || .803 || 3.1 || 1.9 || .4 || .2 || 10.9
|-
| style="text-align:left;"| || 68 || 57 || 25.3 || .470 || .336 || .712 || 7.8 || 1.9 || .7 || .8 || 8.4

Transactions

Trades

Additions

Subtractions

References

External links
 2018–19 New York Knicks at Basketball-Reference.com

New York Knicks seasons
New York Knicks
New York Knicks
New York Knicks
2010s in Manhattan
Madison Square Garden